The 1881 Preston by-election took place on 20 May 1881 after the death of the incumbent MP Edward Hermon. The Conservative candidate William Farrer Ecroyd campaigned on a fair trade platform and won the seat.

Notes

Further reading
B. H. Brown, The Tariff Reform Movement in Great Britain, 1881–1895 (1943).
S. Zebel, ‘Fair Trade: An English Reaction to the Breakdown of the Cobden Treaty System’, Journal of Modern History, 12 (1940), pp. 161–185.

1881 elections in the United Kingdom
1881 in England
1880s in Lancashire
Elections in Preston
By-elections to the Parliament of the United Kingdom in Lancashire constituencies